Colwell is an English surname. Notable people with the surname include:

Bob Colwell (born 1954), American electrical engineer
Carlton H. Colwell (1926–2021), American politician
Dave Colwell (born 1964), English rock guitarist
Eileen Colwell (1904–2002), English librarian
Elizabeth Colwell (1881–1954), American printmaker, typographer and writer
Ernest Cadman Colwell (1901–1974), American biblical scholar, textual critic and palaeographer
Frederick Colwell, American microbiologist
Guy Colwell (born 1945), American painter and cartoonist
Jack Colwell, Australian singer-songwriter
James Colwell (1860–1930), English-born Australian Methodist minister and historian
Jason Colwell (born 1974), Irish footballer
Jeffrey Colwell (born 1965), American lawyer
Keith Colwell (born 1947), Canadian politician
Maria Colwell (1965–1973), British female murder victim
Oliver Colwell (1834–1862), Union Army officer and Medal of Honor recipient
Otis Colwell, American merchant and politician
Patrick Colwell, American politician
Rita R. Colwell (born 1934), American environmental microbiologist and scientific administrator

See also
Jane Colwell-Danis (born 1941), American paleontologist

English-language surnames